Esther Harriet Borough Johnson née George (1866–1958) was an English painter.

Personal life
Esther Harriet George was born on 2 April 1866 at Sutton Maddock, Shifnal, Shropshire. Her father was a clergyman, a curate at the time of her birth and later vicar of Pentney, Norfolk. She had a twin sister Lydia. She married the artist Ernest Borough Johnson (1866–1949) in 1903, and thereafter painted under the name Esther Borough Johnson. She died on 28 October 1958, aged 92, in a nursing home in Worcester Park, Surrey.

Painting career
Johnson studied at Birmingham School of Art, Chelsea Art School and at Hubert von Herkomer's School of Art in Bushey. During her career she exhibited paintings at the Royal Academy in London, with the Royal Institute of Painters in Watercolours, the Royal Institute of Oil Painters and with the Women's International Art Club.  Her works are held in collections including Brighton and Hove Museums and Art Galleries, Bushey Museum and Art Gallery and The Box, Plymouth.

She wrote The technique of flower painting in oil, water-colour, and pastel, published by Pitman (1931), and the introduction to a 1907 Drawings of Michael Angelo published by Newnes.

References

External links

Esther George, AKA Mrs Borough Johnson data on the Cornwall Artists Index

1866 births
1958 deaths
19th-century English painters
19th-century English women artists
20th-century English painters
20th-century English women artists
Alumni of Chelsea College of Arts
Alumni of the Birmingham School of Art
English women painters
Artists from Shropshire